Candace Bushnell (born December 1, 1958) is an American author, journalist, and television producer. She wrote a column for The New York Observer (1994–96) that was adapted into the bestselling Sex and the City anthology. The book was the basis for the HBO hit series Sex and the City (1998–2004) and two subsequent movies.

Bushnell followed this with the international bestselling novels 4 Blondes (2001), Trading Up (2003), Lipstick Jungle (2005), One Fifth Avenue (2008), The Carrie Diaries (2010) and Summer and the City (2011). Two of her novels have been adapted for television: Lipstick Jungle (2008–09) on NBC, and The Carrie Diaries (2013-2014) on The CW. One Fifth Avenue has been optioned by the Mark Gordon Company and ABC for another television show.

Early life
Bushnell was born in Glastonbury, Connecticut. She is the daughter of Calvin L. Bushnell and Camille Salonia. Her father was one of the inventors of the air cooled hydrogen fuel cell that was used in the Apollo space missions in the 1960s. Her Bushnell ancestors in the United States can be traced back to Francis Bushnell, one of the signatories of the Guilford Covenant, who emigrated from Thatcham, Berkshire, England in 1639. Her mother was of Italian descent.

While attending high school in Glastonbury, Candace was accompanied to her senior prom by Mike O'Meara, later a nationally syndicated radio host, who also dated Candace's sister, "Lolly." She attended Rice University and New York University. She moved to New York in the late 1970s and often frequented Studio 54. In 1995, she met publishing executive Ron Galotti, who became the inspiration for Sex and The City'''s Mr. Big.

Career
At the age of 19, Bushnell moved to New York City and sold a children's story (which was never published) to Simon & Schuster. She continued writing and worked as a freelance journalist for various publications, struggling to make ends meet for many years. Bushnell began writing for The New York Observer in 1993. She created a humorous column for the paper (1994–1996) called "Sex and the City". The column was based on her own personal dating experiences and those of her friends. In 1997, Bushnell's columns were published in an anthology, also called Sex and the City, and soon after became the basis for the popular HBO television series sharing the same name. The series aired from 1998 through 2004, and starred Sarah Jessica Parker as Carrie Bradshaw, a socially active New York City sex and lifestyles columnist, a character whom Bushnell has stated was her alter ego. The series entered syndication and was also made into two films: Sex and the City (2008) and Sex and the City 2 (2010). A third film was announced in December 2016, but was ultimately cancelled and replaced by the sequel miniseries, And Just Like That…, on HBO Max. Bushnell went on to publish several international and The New York Times Bestselling novels, including Four Blondes, Trading Up, Lipstick Jungle and One Fifth Avenue. 

In 2005, Bushnell served as one of three judges for the reality television show Wickedly Perfect on CBS. Bushnell began hosting a live weekly talk show on Sirius Satellite Radio in 2007. The show, called "Sex, Success and Sensibility," was canceled in late 2008 after the merger of Sirius and XM Satellite Radio, when Bushnell was asked to continue the show with a 50% pay cut and refused. She is the winner of the 2006 Matrix Award for books, and a recipient of the Albert Einstein Spirit of Achievement Award. In 2009 she wrote a web series, The Broadroom, a comedic series about women over 40 dealing with workplace issues, starring Jennie Garth which was created in partnership with the magazine publisher Meredith Corporation's Meredith 360 division.

Bushnell's 2005 novel, Lipstick Jungle, was adapted for television and aired on NBC in 2008. The series Lipstick Jungle starred Brooke Shields in the leading role, and ran for 20 episodes. In 2009, she wrote articles for Meredith's More magazine.

Bushnell was contracted by HarperCollins in 2008 to write a series of two books for young adults, about the high school years of Sex and the City character Carrie Bradshaw. The first of these, The Carrie Diaries, was published in April 2010. The other, Summer and the City (Carrie Diaries Series #2), was published in April 2011. The Carrie Diaries was a number one New York Times Bestseller.

In 2012 Bushnell was sued in federal court by her former friend and manager Clifford Streit who claimed that Bushnell reneged on a prior settlement in which she agreed to pay him 7.5 percent of anything she earned from the Sex and the City TV series and the two Sex and the City movies, an amount Streit estimated at least $150,000.

Personal life
From 2002 to 2012, Bushnell was married to Charles Askegard, a principal dancer with the New York City Ballet who was ten years her junior, and whom she had met eight weeks before.Don't mention Sex and the City. By Carl Quinn, www.theage.com, September 28, 2003. They decided to divorce in 2011. She found the experience disorienting, telling The Guardian, "When I got divorced, I couldn’t get a mortgage; I didn’t fit into a computer model. All of a sudden, I was invited to no more couple things. Being single is hard and there’s something a bit heroic about it."

She owned a co-op in Greenwich Village until 2015. From 2005 to 2016 she owned a historic Victorian farmhouse in Roxbury, Connecticut. In 2016, she bought a co-op on East 74th Street in Manhattan.

Bibliography
 (1996) Sex and the City, 
 (2000) 4 Blondes,  nur 302
 (2003) Trading Up (2005) Lipstick Jungle, 
 (2008) One Fifth Avenue (2010) The Carrie Diaries (2011) Summer and the City (2015) Killing Monica (2019) Is There Still Sex in the City?'',

References

External links

Official website

TehelkaTV interview – In conversation with Pragya Tiwari on being a woman and writing about it, Jan 2011
Limited online archive of Bushnell's column in The Observer

1958 births
Living people
20th-century American novelists
21st-century American novelists
20th-century American women writers
21st-century American women writers
American columnists
American women columnists
American chick lit writers
People from Glastonbury, Connecticut
New York University alumni
Rice University alumni
American women essayists
American women novelists
Sex and the City
20th-century American essayists
21st-century American essayists